The TL-6 (Tian Long - 6) or Sky Dragon - 6 is a light anti-ship missile.

History
The development of the TL program appeared to have started in the mid-1990s and were originally identified as the FL-8 (TL-10) and FL-9 (TL-6) under China National Aero Technology Import & Export Company (CATIC). The program and missiles were officially revealed in the Zhuhai Airshow in 2004 by the China Aerospace Science and Industry Corporation (CASIC).

Development
TL-6 along with the smaller TL-10 are both developed and manufactured by Hongdu Aviation Industry Corporation.  The origin of TL-6 is similar to that of TL-10: there are thousands small FAC and patrol boats armed with anti-ship missiles that pose great threats, but it is highly inefficient to use anti-ship missiles such as Harpoon missile and Exocet that are designed against large warships for the destruction of these small boats, thus it is necessary to develop a light anti-ship missile to engage these small yet potentially highly lethal boats.

Design
While TL-10 series is specifically designed to engage boats displacing 500 tons or less, TL-6 series is specifically designed to engage larger naval vessel with displacement up to 1,000 tons.  Along with C-704 that covers ships from 1,000 tons to 3,000 tons, and larger anti ship missiles such as C-802 that covers large ships, China has developed a complete anti ship cruise missile families that covers every displacement class.  Western sources have claimed that the Iranian Nasr anti-ship missile is based on TL-6.

Like the anti-ship version of the C-701 and TL-10, TL-6 can also be armed with a television seeker which is interchangeable with TL-10. At the sixth Zhuhai airshow in 2006, the manufacturer revealed the plan already in development to have various platforms including aircraft, surface ships/boats, and from land/vehicle. However, like most light anti-ship missiles in the world, it is certain that this missile would not be launched from submarines, as the manufacturer has confirmed.  Like its smaller cousin TL-6, the version that has been successfully completed is the ship-to-ship version, and hence the designation JJ/TL-6 at the sixth Zhuhai airshow in 2006, with JJ stands for Jian Jian, meaning Ship (to) Ship.

FL-9
FL-9 (FL = Fei Long / Feilong, or 飞龙 in Chinese, meaning Flying Dragon) is the cheaper coastal defense version of TL-6.  Following the tradition of Silkworm missile, a land-based version with the lowest requirement is also developed for this missile: as the missile is stored in a controlled environment in a warehouse on land, the salinity, temperature and relative humidity requirements for the missile itself are greatly reduced. Because it is designed and deployed on land, the associate C4I systems can be located separately: the distributed system prevents electromagnetic interference, and if the C4I system is attacked, the distributed nature of the FL-9 would greatly reduce casualties and damage.

Nasr-1
Nasr-1 is reported to be the Iranian version of TL-6.  However, there are some disagreements over this due to the lack of official confirmation from neither the Iran nor China. While many sources claim that Nasr is based on TL-6, there are others that claim Nasr is based on another Chinese anti-ship missile, C-704 instead.

TL-2
A new version of TL-6 appeared made its public debut at the 7th Zhuhai Airshow held at the end of 2008, together with its smaller cousin TL-1.  Developed by Hongdu Aviation Industry Corporation, the same manufacturer of TL-6, the new missile is designated as TL-2, and appears almost identical to TL-6.  Not much information of TL-2 was released in detail at the air show, and based on scattered technical information published in China, it has been suggested that TL-2 is an upgraded TL-6 with a data link added, so that in addition to the original fire-and-forget capability, the only capability present on TL-10, there is an extra capability present on TL-2: operators can select to attack a different target other than the original one, if a greater threat has been identified after launching TL-2.  These are other speculations on TL-2, such as TL-6 was purely for export, while TL-2 is the designation for domestic Chinese use, but these have yet to be verified when more detailed technical information is released in the future.  Although the manufacturer has claimed that TL-1 can be deployed from various platform, the sample shown at the 7th Zhuhai Airshow was ship-born only, designated as JJ/TL-2, with JJ stands for Jian Jian (舰舰), meaning Ship (to) Ship.

Specification
Dimensions:
Length:   3400 mm - 3500 mm
Diameter: 280 mm
Wingspan: 900 mm
 Weight: 350 kg - 360 kg
Warhead: 30 kg, semi-armor piecing
Powerplant: twin thrust chamber, solid rocket motor
Speed: Mach 0.8 - 0.9
Range: 4–35 km
Guidance: Radar-guided/INS
Kill probability: 0.85
Developer: Hongdu Aviation Industry Corporation

Operators

Current operators
: Islamic Republic of Iran
: People's Republic of China

References
  Report on the 5th Airshow China Zhuhai, Richard Fisher, Jr., PRC, November 1–7, 2004
 China aids Iran's tactical missile programme, Robert Hewson, Janes Defence Weekly, November 11, 2004
TL-2/6

Anti-ship cruise missiles of the People's Republic of China
Air-to-surface missiles
Military equipment introduced in the 2000s